Marithé + François = Girbaud is a fashion documentary film directed by Jérémie Carboni about French stylists Marithé et François Girbaud.

Summary 
Marithé Bachellerie and François Girbaud are French fashion designers, known in the late 1960s for Stonewash : industrialization of denim stone-washing. They are also inventors of new shapes for clothes (Baggy jeans, skin-tight jeans, etc.) and new technologies (as design with laser technology : Wattwash).

Cast
 François Girbaud, French stylist
 Marithé Bachellerie, French stylist
 Renzo Rosso, CEO of Diesel brand
 Lilly Wood and The Prick, French pop-electro duo
 Jacques Rozenker, close associate and stylist
 Antoinette "kiki" Rozenker, close associate and stylist
 Jennifer Beals, American actress (archive footages)

References

External links 
 

Musique concrète
2016 films
French documentary films
2016 documentary films
Documentary films about fashion designers
Films directed by Jérémie Carboni
2010s French films